Uzoamaka Otuadinma (born 18 December 1990) is a Nigerian taekwondo practitioner. She competes in the 73 kg event and has won a gold medal at the Taekwondo African Games and a bronze medal at the 2019 edition held in Rabat.

Career 
At the 2014 Commonwealth Taekwondo Championship held in Edinburgh, she won a bronze medal. The following year, she participated in the  2015 African Games in Brazzaville and she won a gold medal in the Women's Middleweight - 73 kg event.

At the 2016 Olympic Games qualification Africa held in Agadir, she won a bronze medal in the +67 kg event. 
In the 2017 Korea Open at Chuncheon and 2019 Nigeria Open at Abuja, she won a silver. 
At the 2019 Nigeria Open held I Abuja, she won a gold medal. At the 2019 African Games held in Rabat, she represented Nigeria and won a bronze medal.

References

External links 
 Uzoamaka Otuadinma taekwondodata.com

Nigerian female taekwondo practitioners
1990 births
Living people
African Games medalists in taekwondo
African Games gold medalists for Nigeria
African Games bronze medalists for Nigeria
Competitors at the 2015 African Games
Competitors at the 2019 African Games
20th-century Nigerian women
21st-century Nigerian women